A-Plus TV is a Pakistani entertainment TV channel. Its chairman is Abdul Jabbar. It is a major entertainment channel in Pakistan.

A-Plus presents a mix of programs ranging from drama serials, sitcoms, soaps, music shows, Reality shows, morning shows, Talk shows, health shows and magazine shows.

The channel is known for its programming like Aunn Zara, Gohar-e-Nayab, Mera Naam Yousuf Hai, Shehr-e-Ajnabi and Khuda Dekh Raha Hai.

Currently broadcast

Drama
Bubu Ki Beti
Yeh Mera Deewanapan Hai
Parsai
Chupke Se Bahar Ajaye
Aunn Zara
Mera Raqeeb
Phir Wajah Kya Hui
Takkabur
Haseena
Haan Qubool Hai
Shabistaan

Morning Show
Dhanak

Upcoming programming

Comedy
Shugal Mughal

Formerly broadcast

Anthology series
 Dhamak
Haqeeqat
Nikki Aur Buddy
 Yeh Ishq Hai

Comedy series
Albeli Sofia
Atkeliyan
Ghar Ki Baat Hai
 Haseena Moin Ki Kahani
 Khicri Salsa
Korangi Ke Satrangi
 Lucky Garam Hamam
Papu The Great
Rang Rangeelay
 Teen Patti

Horror/supernatural
Dil Nawaz
Mala Mir

Drama serials

 Adhura Milan
 Agan
Ahl-e-Wafa
 Aik Bond Zindagi
Aik Aur Sitam Hai
 Aisa Kyon
 Ankh Salamt Andhay Log
 Anokhi
 Arzoo Jeenay Ki Tu Nahi
 Aunn Zara
 Bare Dhokay Hain Iss Rah Mein
 Barf
 Begaangi
 Bhai 
 Bhatti Chowk
 Bheegi Palkein
 Bichre Tou Ehsas Hua
 Bohtan
 Bubu Ki Beti
 Bari Phuppo
 Chupke Se Bahar Ajaye
 Daab
 Daray Daray Naina
 Dard Aashna
 Deedan
 Deep
 Dheeray Say
 Dil-e-Bekhabar
Dil-e-Bereham
 Dukh Kam Na Honge
 Dumpukht - Aatish-e-Ishq
 Ek Kami Si Hai
Ek Yaad Hai
 Faltu Larki 
 Farwa Ki ABC
 Ghalti
 Ghamand
 Ghari Do Ghari
 Ghayal
 Gohar-e-Nayab
GT Road
Gunnah
 Haara Dil
Hoor Pari
Haseena
 Huay Beganay Kyon
 Inteha e Ishq
 Intezaar
 Is Chand Pe Dagh Nahin
 Ishq Mein Kaafir
 Jaanam
 Jaan'nisar
 Jallan
 Jannat
 Jao Meri Guriya
 Jis Ka Naam Hai Aurat 
 Kaffara (TV series)
 Kahan Ho Tum
 Kaisi Khushi Laya Chand
 Kamal E Zabt
 Karam Jali
 Kaun Karta Hai Wafa
 Keh Do Na
 Khafa Khafa Zindagi
 Khidmat Guzar
 Khuda Dekh Raha Hai
 Khuda Gawah
 Kountry Luv
 Koyla Hogyi Mein
 Kyunke Ishq Baraye Farokht Nahi
 Kyun Mili Saza
 Laal Ishq
 Laikin
 Lamhay
 Love, Life Aur Lahore
 Main Mar Gai Shaukat Ali
 Mann Mar Jaye Na
 Marasim
 Maazi
 Meherbaan
 Mein Mohabbat Aur Tum
Mera Kya Qasoor
 Mera Naam Yousuf Hai
 Mera Pyaar
 Mera Raqeeb
 Mere Bewafa
Mujhe Beta Chahiye
 Mujhe Bhi Khuda Ne Banaya Hai
 Mushrik
 Mutthi Mein Chand
 Nail Polish
Noor
 Pari
 Parsai
 Pehchaan
 Pheeki Theek Kehta Hai
 Pinjra
Qadam Qadam Ishq
Qeemat
 Ranj-e-Aashnayi
 Sacha Sayen
Sakeena
 Sartaaj
 Shadiyane
Sheher
 Shehr e Ajnabi
 Shehryar Shehzadi
Sitam
Sotan
 Takkabur
Teesri Manzil
 Tere Pyar Mein
 Thays
 Uraan
 Veeraiyan
 With Beygum
Yateem
 Yeh Mera Deewanapan Hai

Mini series
Pani Da Bulbula
Piya Tori Yaad

Game shows
Lakhon Ka Such

Soap operas
Agar Tum Na Hote
Bari Phuppo
 Bezuban
Chandan Haar
Ghareeb Zaadi
Gunnah
Ishq Ya Rabba
Kaneez
Kambakht Tanno
Katti Patang
 Kaun Karta Hai Wafa
Mere Jeenay Ki Wajah
Phir Wajah Kya Hui
Piya Bedardi
Rishte Kache Dhagoon Se
Sotan
Zara Sambhal Kay

Talk show/morning shows
Ek Nayi Subha With Farah
Chandini Baatein
Insaaf 24/7
Karachi Nights
Morning With Sahir
Tune Ho Jao
 Good Morning Public
 Meri Subah Haseen Hai
 Subh Ki Fiza
 The Late Night Show with Kanwal Aftab

Reality shows
Artist of The Month

Spiritual show
Taboo

Acquired

Turkish
 Abroo
 Ummeed

Indian dramas
Bandhan
Bepannah
Dil Se Di Dua
Dance India Dance
Mere Rang Mein Rangne Waali
Sone Ki Chiriya
Jhalak Dikhhla Jaa

Films distributed
A-Plus distributed its first film Good Morning Karachi in January 2015 under the banner of A-Plus Films.

References

External links 
 A-Plus Entertainment's official website

Television channels and stations established in 2002
Television stations in Pakistan
Television networks in Pakistan
A&B Entertainment
2002 establishments in Pakistan
 
Television stations in Lahore